The Airbus A330 Multi Role Tanker Transport (MRTT) is a European aerial refuelling and military transport aircraft based on the civilian Airbus A330. A total of 16 countries have placed firm orders for approximately 68 aircraft, of which 51 had been delivered by 30 November 2020. A version of the A330 MRTT, the EADS/Northrop Grumman KC-45, was proposed to the United States Air Force for its aerial tanker replacement programme and selected, but the programme was cancelled.

Design and development

The Airbus A330 MRTT is a military derivative of the A330-200 airliner. It is designed as a dual-role air-to-air refuelling and transport aircraft. For air-to-air refuelling missions, the A330 MRTT can be equipped with a combination of any of the following systems:
 Refuelling other aircraft
 Airbus Military Aerial Refuelling Boom System (ARBS) for receptacle-equipped receiver aircraft.
 Cobham 905E under-wing refuelling pods for probe-equipped receiver aircraft.
 Cobham 805E Fuselage Refuelling Unit (FRU) for probe-equipped receiver aircraft
 Being refuelled
 Universal Aerial Refuelling Receptacle Slipway Installation (UARRSI) for self in-flight refuelling.

The A330 MRTT's wing has common structure with the four-engine A340-200/-300 with reinforced mounting locations and provision for fuel piping for the A340's outboard engines. The A330 MRTT's wing therefore requires little modification to use these hardpoints for the wing refuelling pods.

The A330 MRTT cabin can be modified to carry up to 380 passengers in a single-class configuration, allowing a complete range of configurations from maximised troop transport to complex customisation suitable for VIP and guest missions. Available configurations include 300 passengers in a single class and 266 passengers in two classes. The A330 MRTT can also be configured to perform Medical Evacuation (Medevac) missions; up to 130 standard stretchers can be carried. The main deck cargo configuration allows carriage of standard commercial containers and pallets, military, ISO and NATO pallets (including seats) and containers, and military equipment and other large items which are loaded through a cargo door. Like the A330-200, the A330 MRTT includes two lower deck cargo compartments (forward and aft) and a bulk area capability. The cargo hold has been modified to be able to transport up to eight military pallets in addition to civilian unit load devices (ULDs).

An optional crew rest compartment (CRC) can be installed in the forward cabin, accommodating a spare crew to increase time available for a mission. The passenger cabin of the A330 MRTT can be provided with a set of removable airstairs to enable embarkation and disembarkation when jet bridges or ground support equipment are not available.

Standard commercial A330-200s are delivered from Airbus's Final Assembly Line in Toulouse, France to the Airbus Military Conversion Centre in Getafe, Spain for fitting of refuelling systems and military avionics. The tanker was certified by Spanish authorities in October 2010. The first delivered aircraft (the third to be converted) arrived in Australia on 30 May 2011 and was formally handed over to the Royal Australian Air Force (RAAF) two days later on 1 June.

On 30 September 2016, Airbus Defence and Space completed the first flight of the new standard A330 MRTT. The new standard features structural modifications, aerodynamic improvements for a 1% fuel-burn reduction, upgraded avionics computers, and enhanced military systems. The first delivery was planned for 2018.

An Airbus/Saab team proposed an A330-based Airborne early warning and control (AEW&C) ("AWACS") variant with Saab's Erieye radar to the UK's Ministry of Defence in 2018 for the replacement of its Boeing E-3 Sentry fleet.

The boom operators sit at a video console using the Boom Enhanced Vision System. It uses a 3D camera vision system for day and night vision and ergonomics are significantly improved compared to operating in a prone position

Operational history
The A330 MRTT has been ordered by Australia, France, the United Kingdom, the United Arab Emirates, Saudi Arabia, Singapore, South Korea, Canada, and by NATO in a multi-nation deal. Australia was the launch customer for the A330 MRTT.

Australia

Designated as KC-30A, the RAAF A330 MRTTs are equipped with both an Aerial Refuelling Boom System (ARBS) and two Cobham 905E under-wing refuelling pods. They are powered by two General Electric CF6-80E1A3 engines and are configured to carry up to 270 passengers plus 34,000 kilograms of cargo. Australia initially arranged to procure four MRTTS with an option to obtain a fifth; this option for a fifth was exercised to allow for two simultaneous deployments of two aircraft, the fifth being for contingency coverage. Australian KC-30As are operated by No. 33 Squadron RAAF, based at RAAF Base Amberley near Brisbane in Queensland.

In 2005, the RAAF expected deliveries to begin in 2008 and end in 2010. Deliveries fell two years behind schedule, partly due to boom development issues. On 30 May 2011, KC-30A RAAF serial A39-003, the third converted A330, arrived at RAAF Base Amberley and was formally handed over on 1 June 2011, thus becoming the first MRTT to be delivered to an end user. The second, A39-002, was handed over on 22 June 2011. On 3 December 2012, the fifth KC-30A was delivered to the RAAF. While the first conversion was performed in Spain, Qantas Defence Services converted the other four RAAF A330-200s at its Brisbane facility on behalf of EADS. In July 2013, there were reportedly delays to the KC-30A's full service entry due to refuelling issues, such as the hose-and-drogue system passing too much fuel.

In August 2013, the KC-30A made its debut as a VIP transport, ferrying Prime Minister Kevin Rudd and an entourage to Al Minhad Air Base in the United Arab Emirates. In August 2014, Defence Minister David Johnston announced the country's intention to buy two more KC-30As, one with a VIP layout for the Prime Minister's use. In July 2015, Defence Minister Kevin Andrews announced the order of two additional KC-30s, to be converted from A330-200s previously operated by Qantas, for delivery in 2018. In 2016, the decision was made to add a modest VIP fitout, including seating, meeting spaces and communication facilities, to a single KC-30, which remains primarily used as a tanker. The 2016 Defence White Paper noted a possible rise in the fleet's size, to nine, to support new RAAF aircraft such as the Boeing P-8 Poseidon.

On 22 September 2014, the RAAF deployed an Air Task Group, including F/A-18F Super Hornets, a KC-30A and a Boeing E-7A Wedgetail airborne early warning and control aircraft, to Al Minhad Air Base in the United Arab Emirates, as part of a coalition to combat Islamic State forces in Iraq. The KC-30 started operations days after arriving in the UAE, refuelling coalition aircraft over Iraq. On 6 October 2014, the RAAF conducted its first combat missions over Iraq via two Super Hornets supported by the KC-30.

In December 2016, an RAAF KC-30 conducted air-to-air refuelling trials with a US Air Force B-1B bomber.

United Kingdom

In January 2004, the UK Ministry of Defence announced the selection of an A330 MRTT variant to provide tanking for the RAF for the next 30 years under the Future Strategic Tanker Aircraft (FSTA) programme, replacing the RAF's TriStar and VC10 tankers. The Ministry of Defence entered negotiations with the EADS-led AirTanker consortium. On 27 March 2008, a deal was signed to lease 14 MRTTs under a private finance initiative arrangement with AirTanker, with the first to enter service in 2011. The service's annual cost, including military personnel costs is around £450 million for a delivery of 18,000 flying hours a rate of approximately £25,000 per hour. There are two versions, designated Voyager KC.Mk 2 and Voyager KC.Mk 3; the former is fitted with two Cobham 905E under-wing refuelling pods, the latter with a Cobham 805E Fuselage Refuelling Unit (FRU) in addition to the under-wing pods; none are fitted with the Aerial Refuelling Boom System (ARBS). All Voyagers are powered by a pair of Rolls-Royce Trent 772B-60 engines.

By May 2014, nine aircraft had been delivered, completing the core fleet. Further deliveries were for a "surge capability", available to the RAF when needed, but otherwise available to AirTanker for "release to the civil market, less its military equipment or to partner nations in a military capacity with the MoD's agreement". By 14 March 2016, all 14 Voyagers had been delivered. In November 2015, it was announced that a Voyager would be refitted to carry government ministers and members of the Royal Family on official visits. The refit cost £10m but was claimed to save roughly £775,000 annually compared to charter flights. ZZ336 is fitted with 158 seats and is known as Vespina. It entered service on 6 May 2016, the then Prime Minister David Cameron made his first flight on it to attend the 2016 Warsaw NATO summit. In June 2020, ZZ336 received a new livery based on the colours of the Union Flag at the request of the British Prime Minister Boris Johnson. Although undertaken as a part of routine maintenance, the new livery's cost was stated to be approximately £900,000.

Because the RAF's Voyagers are only capable of probe-and-drogue refuelling, they are unable to refuel current or future RAF aircraft that are fitted solely for flying boom refuelling, including the Boeing RC-135, Boeing C-17 Globemaster III, Boeing 737 AEW&C and Boeing P-8 Poseidon. In April 2016, the RAF stated its interest in fitting a boom to some Voyagers, bringing its fleet into line with other MRTT operators. Fitting a boom would add flexibility to the RAF Voyagers, not only allowing operation with those types in the RAF not fitted for probe and drogue but for other air forces that operate boom-refuelled aircraft.

On 18 November 2022, an RAF Voyager completed the world-first 100% sustainable fuel military transporter flight; part of the RAF's plan to become net-zero by 2040.

United Arab Emirates
In 2007, the United Arab Emirates announced it had signed a memorandum of understanding with Airbus to purchase three A330 MRTTs. A contract was signed with the UAE in February 2008. The first UAE A330 MRTT was delivered on 6 February 2013. The remaining two were delivered by 6 August 2013. The UAE tankers are equipped with both an ARBS and two Cobham 905E under-wing refuelling pods; these ARBS units include a secondary boom hoist developed for the UAE. This system permits the boom to be retracted, even in the event of a primary boom retraction system failure. The UAE tankers are fitted with Rolls-Royce Trent 700 engines. On 14 November 2021, UAE ordered two additional MRTTs.

Saudi Arabia

Saudi Arabia finalised an agreement to purchase three A330 MRTTs equipped with both an Aerial Refuelling Boom System (ARBS) and two Cobham 905E under-wing refuelling pods on 3 January 2008. In July 2009, it was announced that Saudi Arabia ordered three additional MRTTs. The Royal Saudi Air Force (RSAF) chose General Electric CF6-80 engines to power its A330 MRTTs.

On 25 February 2013, the first Saudi MRTT entered operational use. Three more MRTTs were ordered in a follow-on contract; delivery was expected in late 2014. By 31 August 2013, three had been delivered.

Singapore
In February 2012, Singapore expressed interest in the A330 MRTT to replace its four Boeing KC-135s. In February 2014, the Republic of Singapore Air Force (RSAF) selected the A330 MRTT over the Boeing KC-46, signing for six aircraft.

The first A330 MRTT arrived in Singapore on 14 August 2018 in a special livery. It made its first public appearance at the RSAF's 50th anniversary parade on 1 September 2018. The RSAF's six A330 MRTTs attained full operational capability (FOC) on 20 April 2021 and currently fly with the 112 Squadron at Changi Air Base (East) in Singapore.

South Korea
On 30 June 2015, South Korea selected the A330 MRTT; the Republic of Korea Air Force (ROKAF) planned to induct four tankers by 2020. The first MRTT was delivered on 12 November 2018, after a ferry flight from Airbus's final assembly line in Getafe, Spain to South Korea, piloted by a joint Airbus and ROKAF crew. Designated KC-330 Cygnus, it extends the endurance of ROKAF aircraft over remote areas such as Dokdo, Ieodo, and the North Pyongyang-Wonsan Line, as well as increase its ability to deploy overseas for international operations. South Korea received its second MRTT in March 2019  and the third in July 2019. The aircraft are powered by Rolls-Royce Trent 700 engines.

France

In November 2011, France expressed interest in acquiring 14 A330 MRTTs to replace its Boeing KC-135 tankers and Airbus A340 and A310 transports; one year later, it was announced that 14 would be ordered in 2013. In May 2013, Airbus made an offer for 12 to 14 A330 MRTTs to France. On 20 February 2014, the French Chief of Staff stated that 12 A330 MRTTs would be acquired in two batches, an initial standard configuration with a boom and wing refuelling pods and later with a cargo door and SATCOM. On 15 December 2015, France ordered eight A330 MRTTs, constituting the second tranche of a multi-year contract for 12 A330 MRTTs, worth €3 billion ($3.3 billion), signed by the French Ministry of Defence in November 2014. Initial deliveries were expected in 2018, with further handovers of one or two per year until 2025.

In September 2018, the Direction générale de l'armement (DGA) announced plans to speed up delivery of the A330 MRTT Phénix, as it is known in French service, by two years, planning for the last of 12 aircraft to be delivered in 2023 rather than 2025. In addition, the DGA stated that the fleet would be later increased to 15 aircraft. Later in September, the French Air Force received the first A330 MRTT as per the existing timetable. On 13 December 2018, France ordered another three A330 MRTTs of a third tranche of the multi-year contract; these are powered by Rolls-Royce Trent 700 engines and equipped with the ARBS and underwing hose-and-drogue refuelling pods.

Multinational Multi-Role Tanker Transport Fleet

In November 2011, the European Defence Agency (EDA) Steering Board and European Defence Ministers endorsed air-to-air refuelling (AAR) as one of the initial Pooling and Sharing initiatives after recognising the need for a greater AAR capability as it was heavily reliant on US Air Force tankers. In November 2012, the Ministers of Defence of 10 EDA member states (the Netherlands, Belgium, France, Greece, Spain, Hungary, Luxembourg, Poland, Portugal and Norway) signed a letter of intent to jointly procure a multi-role tanker transport. The Netherlands was designated leader of the newly launched Multinational Multi-Role Tanker Transport Fleet (MMF) project, which had the aim of creating an initial European AAR capability by 2020. In 2013, the Netherlands expressed interest in the A330 MRTT to replace its two KDC-10 aircraft; a study was launched on standardising European AAR capability in cooperation with other MFF members.

In December 2014, following a request for information, the bulk of the MMF member states entered negotiations with Airbus to procure an A330 MRTT fleet to be owned by NATO while the Organisation for Joint Armament Cooperation (OCCAR) and the NATO Support and Procurement Agency would support the procurement process. This was accompanied by a request for proposals sent by OCCAR to Airbus for two MRTTs with options for six more; only the Netherlands and Luxembourg were full MMF members at this point. It was decided to base these MRTTs at Eindhoven Air Base, which has noise clearance to operate up to eight MRTTs. In July 2016, the Netherlands and Luxembourg jointly ordered the first two MRTTs under the MMF programme, the first scheduled for delivery by 2020. In June 2017, Germany and Norway became MMF members, pledging to order five more MRTTs plus options for a further four. On 26 September 2017, Airbus announced receipt of OCCAR's firm order for five additional tankers.

The Belgian Ministry of Defence stated the intent to buy one A330 MRTT in a 2015 defence plan. The Belgian government investigated the €840 million plan, as well as the option of equipping Belgium's seven A400Ms with under-wing pods; a combined Belgian A330 MRTT and A400M fleet would cost up to €1 billion. On 22 December 2017, Belgium signed a contract for one MRTT, to be based at Eindhoven Air Base, bringing the MMF to eight aircraft. and officially joined the programme on 14 February 2018.

On 19 December 2017, NATO partnered with Israel's Elbit Systems to provide J-Music electronic countermeasures systems to the fleet. Having considered joining the initiative for some time, the Czech Republic joined as the sixth member during October 2019. In September 2020, Luxembourg committed to an extra 1,000 hours and to provide funding for a ninth MRTT via an existing contract option.

Out of the total of nine aircraft currently on order, five will be based at Eindhoven Air Base in the Netherlands and four at Cologne Bonn Airport in Germany. On 30 June 2020, Airbus delivered the first A330 MRTT. On 31 August 2021, the fifth aircraft was delivered. Aircraft six and seven, respectively were delivered on 26 and 28 July 2022.

Spain
Spain's Ministry of Defence stated that it was to acquire two A330 MRTT in 2016 to replace its ageing Boeing 707 tankers. In 2014, Spain's Secretary of State for Defence stated that negotiations had begun with Airbus about switching its excess order for 13 Airbus A400Ms to an undisclosed number of A330 MRTTs. The Airbus Defence and Space commercial director said that although it was a difficult issue, the company would negotiate with Spain to reach an agreement. In September 2020, Spain agreed to buy from Iberia three A330s no longer needed due to the economic impact of the COVID-19 pandemic, then modify them to serve as a MRTT fleet. On 12 November 2021, Spain signed an order for three MRTTs from Airbus.

Brazil
On 28 January 2021, Brazilian President Jair Bolsonaro announced negotiations for two A330 MRTT for the Brazilian Air Force. On 13 May 2021, the Ministry of Defence released a statement authorizing the deal, reportedly from the RAF's active inventory. On 30 June 2021, the British military attaché for Brazil, Royal Navy's Captain Mark Albon, confirmed the ongoing negotiations, conducted by the UK ambassador to Brazil and Ministry of Defence officials. On 27 January 2022, the Brazilian Air Force ended negotiations with the RAF and launched international bidding to buy two A330-200s on the civil market, estimated at US$81 million.

On 6 April 2022, Azul Brazilian Airlines was declared the supplier by the Ministry of Defence. The agreements with Airbus, conversion costs and delivery schedule were kept confidential. Conversion work into A330 MRTTs is to be carried out at Airbus's plant in Getafe, Spain. The aircraft are to be fitted with two Cobham 905E under-wing pods and a Cobham FRU-805E fuselage refuelling unit, and based at the Galeão Air Force Base in Rio de Janeiro. VIP transport is also a possibility, in order to replace the Airbus A319ACJ in presidential trips requiring intercontinental range. According to one source, they will be designated C-330 prior to the tanker conversions; thereafter, they may be redesignated KC-330. Other sources suggest the designation will be KC-30.

Canada
In April 2021, Airbus was declared the only qualified supplier to replace Canada's RCAF CC-150 Polaris refuelling and VIP transport aircraft, beating out Boeing's KC-46 Pegasus. In July 2022, a $102M deal was finalised to acquire two used A330-200s from the International Airfinance Corporation for passenger/cargo-only use that is expected to be converted into MRTTs by Airbus in the future; it is anticipated that up to four more MRTTs will be acquired, for a total of six aircraft.

Potential operators

Indonesia
In January 2018, Indonesian Air Force (TNI-AU) officials were reportedly studying both the A330 MRTT and Boeing KC-46 Pegasus tankers for a future modernisation programme, expected to take place after completion of the Airbus A400M Atlas programme. The TNI-AU was said to compare compatibility with its current aircraft; life-cycle costs; interoperability with current and future assets; and potential funding and technology transfer options with state-owned aircraft manufacturer Indonesian Aerospace.

India
The A330 MRTT and Ilyushin Il-78 competed for a tender floated in 2006 by the Indian Ministry of Defence (MoD) for six refuellers to extend the Indian Air Force's (IAF) operating radius. In May 2009, India chose the A330 MRTT over the Il-78. However, in January 2010, the government cancelled the order, citing high cost as the reason, reportedly against the IAF's wishes. After rebidding, India selected Airbus as its "preferred vendor" in November 2012. In January 2013, India reportedly chose the A330 MRTT as the "preferred bid". In 2016, Airbus said India's MoD had terminated the six-year-old US$2 billion tender for six MRTTs.

In January 2018, the IAF re-launched its aerial refuelling procurement programme, sending out a request for information (RFI) to Airbus, Boeing and Ilyushin. Both Airbus and Boeing responded to the RFI, while Ilyushin was disqualified as the requirement sought an aircraft with two turbofan engines. In 2017, India announced plans to purchase six airborne early warning and control (AEW&C) ("AWACS") aircraft that can also perform aerial refuelling, with the first two AEW&C aircraft awaiting approval by Cabinet in 2020. However, in September 2021, it was decided to use six Airbus A321s acquired from Air India instead.

United States
Lockheed Martin is proposing a variant called LMXT for the Bridge Tanker Competition referred to as KC-Y, which could lead to a contract to build up to 160 aircraft.

Others
On 27 March 2014, Airbus announced that the Qatar Emiri Air Force intended to purchase two A330 MRTTs.

As of 2018, Sweden was reportedly considering joining the Multinational Multi-Role Tanker Transport Fleet programme.

In May 2021, it was revealed that Egypt was considering the purchase of two A330 MRTTs as part of a Rafale fighter deal with France.

Failed bids

United States

The US Air Force (USAF) ran a procurement programme to replace around 100 of its oldest KC-135E Stratotankers, i.e., initially excluding the more common updated KC-135R variant. EADS offered the A330 MRTT. The Boeing KC-767 was selected in 2002; however the USAF cancelled the KC-767 order upon the uncovering of illegal manipulation and corrupt practices during the competition.

In 2006, the USAF released a new request for proposal (RFP) for a tanker aircraft, which was updated in January 2007, to the KC-X RFP, one of three acquisition programmes that are intended to replace the entire KC-135 fleet. The A330 MRTT was proposed again by EADS and Northrop Grumman as the KC-30. It again competed against the Boeing KC-767, a smaller and less expensive aircraft with less fuel and cargo capability. Northrop Grumman and EADS announced plans to assemble the aircraft at a new facility in Mobile, Alabama, which would also build A330 freighters. On 29 February 2008, the USAF announced the selection of the KC-30 as the KC-135 replacement, and was designated KC-45A. On 18 June 2008, the United States Government Accountability Office (GAO) upheld a protest by Boeing on the contract's award to Northrop Grumman and EADS over process improprieties. This left the status of the KC-45A in doubt, because the GAO decision required the USAF to rebid the contract.

On 24 September 2009, the USAF began the first steps in the new round of bids, with a clearer set of criteria. On 8 March 2010, Northrop Grumman withdrew from the bidding process, asserting that the new criteria were skewed in favour of Boeing's offering. On 20 April 2010, EADS announced it was re-entering the competition on a stand-alone basis and intended to enter a bid with the KC-45, still intending for Mobile to be the final assembly site. On 24 February 2011, the USAF announced that the development contract had been awarded to Boeing. William J. Lynn III, the deputy defence secretary, said Boeing was "the clear winner" under a formula that considered the bid prices, how well each tanker met needs and the operating costs over 40 years.

Variants

A330 MRTT
An Airbus A330-200 converted by Airbus Military for air-refuelling duties.
KC-30A
Australian designation for an A330 MRTT with two under-wing refuelling pods and an Aerial Refuelling Boom System.
KC-45A
United States Air Force designation for an A330 MRTT with two under-wing refuelling pods and an Aerial Refuelling Boom System, order cancelled.
Voyager KC2
Royal Air Force designation for an A330 MRTT with two Cobham 905 under-wing pods, primarily used for refuelling fast jets.
Voyager KC3
Royal Air Force designation for an A330 MRTT with two under-wing pods and a "Cobham Fuselage Refuelling Unit (FRU)" for a centreline refuelling capability, primarily used for refuelling large aircraft.

Operators

As of 31 December 2022, a total of 67 A330 MRTT had been ordered from Airbus Military. 56 have been delivered, including seven of the nine ordered by NATO's Multinational Multi-Role Tanker Transport Fleet (MMF).

Royal Australian Air Force (RAAF) – 7 delivered, including two converted from second-hand airliners.
No. 33 Squadron

Brazilian Air Force (FAB) – 2 former civilian aircraft ordered 2022 (order not listed in Airbus O&D report as of 31 December 2022).

Royal Canadian Air Force – 2 former civilian aircraft ordered in July 2022 (order not listed in Airbus O&D report as of 31 December 2022).

French Air and Space Force (AAE) – 13 aircraft ordered with 9 delivered.

Royal Netherlands Air Force – 9 aircraft ordered with 7 delivered for NATO MRTT Squadron. All aircraft are registered as Dutch Military Aircraft; participating air forces are: Belgium, Czech Republic, Germany, Luxembourg, Norway and the Netherlands.

Royal Saudi Air Force (RSaudAF) – 6 delivered
No. 24 Squadron

Republic of Singapore Air Force (RSAF) – 6 delivered
No.112 Squadron

Republic of Korea Air Force (ROKAF) – 4 delivered
5th Air Mobility Wing

Spanish Air and Space Force (SASF) – 3 aircraft ordered.

United Arab Emirates Air Force (UAEAF) – 3 delivered and 2 on order.
Air Refuelling Squadron

Royal Air Force (RAF) – 14 delivered (seven KC2s, five KC3s, and two fitted out as KC3s). Aircraft owned by AirTanker Services (commonly known as AirTanker) which operates or wet-leases out aircraft not required by RAF tasking.
No. 10 Squadron, at RAF Brize Norton, Oxfordshire
No. 101 Squadron, at RAF Brize Norton, Oxfordshire
No. 1312 Flight, at RAF Mount Pleasant, Falkland Islands – 1 x Voyager KC2

Accidents and incidents
On 19 January 2011, an air refuelling accident occurred between a boom-equipped A330 MRTT and a Portuguese Air Force General Dynamics F-16 Fighting Falcon over the Atlantic Ocean off the coast of Portugal. Early reports indicated that the boom broke off at the aft end of the boom near the F-16's receptacle, causing the boom to recoil into the MRTT's underside. The boom then became uncontrollable and oscillated until it broke off the boom assembly at the pivot point. Both aircraft were damaged but landed safely. The A330 MRTT involved was an Airbus test aircraft destined for the RAAF, operated by an Airbus crew. At the time of the incident, Airbus had not yet begun deliveries.

The boom separated cleanly at a mechanical joint and fell to the ground, while the tanker landed safely in Getafe without any injuries. The fault was attributed to a conflict between the backup boom hoist (fitted to the UAE-destined MRTTs) and the primary boom retraction mechanism, as well as to the test conducted. Airbus later explained that the malfunction was not possible under ordinary operating conditions, and that procedures had been implemented to avoid similar incidents in the future. Following the incident, the Instituto Nacional de Técnica Aeroespacial, Spain's airworthiness authority, issued precautionary restrictions to other users of boom-equipped A330s.

Specifications

See also

References

External links

 
Airtanker Consortium
Rivals eye Boeing's US airforce deal, by Jorn Madslien, BBC News
RAAF: New tankers to take on many roles

A330 MRTT
2000s international military tanker aircraft
2000s international military transport aircraft
Twinjets
Airbus A330
Low-wing aircraft
Aircraft first flown in 2007